Koit (Estonian: "Dawn") is a song by Tõnis Mägi, made popular during the Estonian Singing Revolution. It is often seen as Mägi's signature song.

The song is a protest song, promoting the aims of Estonians looking to secede from the Soviet Union. The lyric is quite allusive, with references to a "new dawn" breaking. The final lines, however, make Mägi's point explicit, as he sings (in translation):

Land, land of my fathers, so sacred a land
Which must now be free
Our song, our song of freedom will sound
And you will see a free Estonia.

The song is frequently performed at the Estonian Laulupidu and other patriotic events.

References

Estonian songs
Year of song missing